The Folkedal Tunnel is a road tunnel in Voss Municipality in Vestland county, Norway. Breakthrough in the tunnel occurred on October 29, 2014.

The name Folkedalstunellen ('Folkedal Tunnel') was officially approved by the Hordaland County Municipality, which was the project's contractor. The tunnel was built as part of landslide protection measures between Norheimsund and the Hardanger Bridge.

References

Voss
Road tunnels in Vestland